Sir William Nosworthy  (18 October 1867 – 26 September 1946) was a New Zealand politician. He briefly served as Minister of Finance and then Minister of External Affairs in the Reform Government.

Biography

The Second Ballot Act was in force and on election night, he was in third place behind David Jones. Nosworthy encouraged his supporters to vote for Jones in the second ballot. After a recount, the situation was reversed (Nosworthy was 30 votes ahead) and Jones advertised for his supporters to vote for Nosworthy, and indeed, Nosworthy was successful in the second ballot.

Nosworthy held this electorate until his retirement at the 1928 election, serving through six terms of Parliament.

He was first appointed to Cabinet in 1919, being appointed Minister of Agriculture (1919–1925) and then Minister of Immigration (1920–1925) by William Massey. When Massey died in 1925, Nosworthy gained the more important role of Minister of Finance in the interim government of Francis Bell.

Nosworthy contested the leadership race to succeed Massey, but was defeated by Gordon Coates. He continued to serve as Minister of Finance until the following year, when he was given the External Affairs portfolio instead (1926–1928). He held this position until his retirement from politics in 1928.

He was appointed a Knight Commander of the Order of St Michael and St George in the 1929 New Year Honours, and was awarded the King George V Silver Jubilee Medal in 1935.

Notes

References

|-

1867 births
1946 deaths
Members of the Cabinet of New Zealand
Reform Party (New Zealand) MPs
New Zealand finance ministers
New Zealand foreign ministers
New Zealand MPs for South Island electorates
Members of the New Zealand House of Representatives
New Zealand Knights Commander of the Order of St Michael and St George
People from Ashburton, New Zealand
New Zealand politicians awarded knighthoods